Raju Cutac (possibly from Quechua rahu snow, ice, mountain with snow, Ancash Quechua kuta flour; corner, -q a suffix), Rajo Cutac or Rajutuna (possibly from Quechua tuna slope, "snow peak slope"), is a  mountain in the Cordillera Blanca in the Andes of Peru. It is situated in the Ancash Region, Bolognesi Province, Aquia District. Raju Cutac lies southeast of Challhua and Tuco.

References 

Mountains of Peru
Mountains of Ancash Region